The long-legged pipit or long-clawed pipit (Anthus pallidiventris) is a species of bird in the family Motacillidae.
It is found in Angola, Cameroon, Republic of the Congo, Democratic Republic of the Congo, Equatorial Guinea, and Gabon.
Its natural habitat is subtropical or tropical dry lowland grassland.

References

Anthus
Birds of Central Africa
Birds described in 1885
Taxonomy articles created by Polbot